The 1st Louisiana Battery Light Artillery (African Descent) was organized at Hebron's Plantation, Missouri, November 6, 1863. Attached to 1st Brigade, U.S. Colored Troops, District of Vicksburg, to April, 1864. On duty at Goodrich Landing and Vicksburg till April, 1864. Designation of Battery changed to Battery "C", 2nd U.S. Colored Light Artillery, April 26, 1864.

Organized from 1st Louisiana Battery, African Descent. Designated Battery "A" March 11, 1864, and Batter "C", April 26, 1864. Attached to Post Goodrich Landing, District of Vicksburg, Mississippi, to May, 1864. Post of Louisiana, District of Vicksburg, Mississippi, to December 1864. Reserve Artillery, Post of Vicksburg, Mississippi, District of Vicksburg, Mississippi, to December, 1865. Post and garrison duty at Goodrich Landing, Vicksburg, and Milliken's Bend and in the Department of Mississippi till December, 1865. Mustered out December 28, 1865.

See also
List of Louisiana Union Civil War units

References

Bibliography 
Dyer, Frederick H. (1959). A Compendium of the War of the Rebellion. Sagamore Press, Inc. Thomas Yoseloff, Publisher. New York. 

Units and formations of the Union Army from Louisiana
Military units and formations established in 1863
1863 establishments in Louisiana
Artillery units and formations of the American Civil War
Military units and formations disestablished in 1865